Eusarca tibiaria is a species of geometrid moth in the family Geometridae.

The MONA or Hodges number for Eusarca tibiaria is 6940.

References

Further reading

 

Ourapterygini
Articles created by Qbugbot
Moths described in 1940